Emmylou Harris (born April 2, 1947) is an American singer, songwriter and musician. She has released dozens of albums and singles over the course of her career and has won 14 Grammys, the Polar Music Prize, and numerous other honors, including becoming a member of the Grand Ole Opry in 1992 and an induction into the Country Music Hall of Fame in 2008. In 2018, she was presented the Grammy Lifetime Achievement Award.
 	
Harris' work and recordings include work as a solo artist, a bandleader, an interpreter of other composers' works, a singer-songwriter, and a backing vocalist and duet partner. She has worked with numerous artists.

Biography

Early years
Harris is from a career military family. Her father, Walter Rutland Harris (1921–1993), was a Marine Corps officer, and her mother, Eugenia (1921–2014), was a wartime military wife. Her father was reported missing in action in Korea in 1952 and spent ten months as a prisoner of war. Born in Birmingham, Alabama, Harris spent her childhood in North Carolina and Woodbridge, Virginia, where she graduated from Gar-Field Senior High School as class valedictorian. She won a drama scholarship to the School of Music, Theatre and Dance at University of North Carolina at Greensboro, where she began to study music and learn the songs of Pete Seeger, Bob Dylan and Joan Baez on guitar. She dropped out of college to pursue her musical aspirations and moved to New York City, working as a waitress to support herself while performing folk songs in Greenwich Village coffeehouses during the 1960s folk music boom. She married fellow songwriter Tom Slocum in 1969 and recorded her first album, Gliding Bird. Harris and Slocum soon divorced, and Harris and her newborn daughter Hallie moved in with her parents in Clarksville, Maryland, a suburb between Baltimore and Washington, D.C.

With Gram Parsons
Harris soon returned to performing as part of a trio with Gerry Mule and Tom Guidera. In 1971, members of the country rock group the Flying Burrito Brothers saw her perform; former Byrds member Chris Hillman had taken over the band and was impressed by Harris, and briefly considered asking her to join the Flying Burrito Brothers. Instead, Hillman recommended her to Gram Parsons, who was looking for a female vocalist to collaborate with on his first solo album, GP. Harris toured as a member of Parsons's band, the Fallen Angels, in 1973, and the pair shone during vocal harmonies and duets. Later that year, Parsons and Harris worked on a studio album, Grievous Angel. Parsons died in his motel room near what is now Joshua Tree National Park on September 19, 1973, from an accidental overdose of drugs and alcohol. Parsons's Grievous Angel was released posthumously in 1974, and three more tracks from his sessions with Harris were included on another posthumous Parsons album, Sleepless Nights, in 1976. One more album of recorded material from that period was packaged as Live 1973, but was not released until 1982.

The Hot Band

Warner Brothers A&R representative Mary Martin introduced Harris to Canadian producer Brian Ahern, who produced her major label debut album, Pieces of the Sky, released in 1975 on Reprise Records. The album was surprisingly eclectic, especially by Nashville standards, including cover versions of the Beatles' "For No One", Merle Haggard's "Tonight the Bottle Let Me Down" and the Louvin Brothers' "If I Could Only Win Your Love".  It also featured "Bluebird Wine", a composition by a young Texas songwriter, Rodney Crowell, who was the first in a long line of songwriters whose talents Harris has championed. The record was one of the most expensive country records produced at the time, featuring the talents of James Burton, Glen Hardin, Ron Tutt, Ray Pohlman, and Bill Payne, as well as two tracks ("Before Believing" and "Queen of the Silver Dollar") that were cut with the Angel Band. Two singles were released: "Too Far Gone", which initially charted at No. 73 (a 1979 reissue hit No. 13), and Harris's first big hit, "If I Could Only Win Your Love", a duet with Herb Pedersen (later a founding member of the Desert Rose Band), which peaked at No. 4.

Executives of Warner Bros. Records (Reprise Records' parent company) told Harris they would agree to record her if she would "get a hot band". Harris did so, enlisting guitarist James Burton and pianist Glen Hardin, both of whom had played with Elvis Presley as well as Parsons. Burton was a renowned guitarist, starting in Ricky Nelson's band in the 1950s, and Hardin had been a member of the Crickets. Other Hot Band members were drummer John Ware, pedal steel guitarist Hank DeVito, and bassist Emory Gordy, Jr., with whom Harris had worked while performing with Parsons. Singer-songwriter Crowell was enlisted as a rhythm guitarist and duet partner. Harris's first tour schedule originally dovetailed around Presley's, owing to Burton and Hardin's continuing commitments to Presley's band.

Elite Hotel, released in December 1975, established that the buzz created by Pieces of the Sky was well-founded. Unusual for country albums at the time, which largely revolved around a hit single, Harris's albums borrowed their approach from the album-oriented rock market. In terms of quality and artistic merit, tracks like "Sin City", "Wheels", and "Till I Gain Control Again", which weren't singles, easily stood against tracks like "Together Again", "Sweet Dreams", and "One of These Days", which were. Elite Hotel was a No. 1 country album and also did sufficiently well as a crossover success with the rock audience. Harris appealed to those who normally disapproved of the country market's pull toward crossover pop singles ("Together Again" and "Sweet Dreams" both topped the country charts). Elite Hotel won a Grammy in 1976 for Best Country Vocal Performance, Female.

Harris's reputation for guest work continued. She contributed to albums by Linda Ronstadt, Guy Clark and Neil Young, and she was tapped by Bob Dylan to perform on his Desire album. Harris also filmed one of the studio sequences, owing to her touring schedule, in the Band's The Last Waltz, singing "Evangeline".

Burton left the Hot Band in 1976, choosing to remain with Elvis Presley's band, and was replaced by English guitarist Albert Lee. Harris's commercial apex was Luxury Liner, released in 1977, which remains one of her definitive records. On Luxury Liner, Harris's mix of songs from Chuck Berry ("(You Never Can Tell) C'est la Vie"), Gram Parsons (the title track and "She"), the Carter Family ("Hello Stranger") and Kitty Wells ("Making Believe") illustrate a continuity and artistic merit to country music often overlooked at the time. Even so, many fans expected more original tunes, so she became known as a cover artist. Despite Top Ten singles with "C'est la Vie" and "Making Believe", the album's best-known track is the first recorded cover of Townes Van Zandt's classic "Pancho & Lefty", which would be a No. 1 hit for Willie Nelson and Merle Haggard in 1983. At the end of 1977, Crowell left the Hot Band to pursue a solo career; his replacement was bluegrass multi-instrumentalist and singer Ricky Skaggs.

Quarter Moon in a Ten Cent Town signaled a slight change of direction from Harris's previous three albums.  Rather than mixing classic and contemporary, the album is made up largely of recently written songs, though from a wide variety of writers. "Two More Bottles of Wine", written by Delbert McClinton, became Harris's third No. 1 single; "To Daddy", written by Dolly Parton, went to No. 3; and a third single, "Easy From Now On", written by Carlene Carter and Susanna Clark, Top Twenty. The album included two songs by Crowell ("I Ain't Living Long Like This" and "Leaving Louisiana in the Broad Daylight"), two by songwriter Jesse Winchester ("Defying Gravity" and "My Songbird"), and one by Utah Phillips ("Green Rolling Hills").

The Roots records

In January 1977, Harris married Brian Ahern.
Their daughter, Meghann, was born in 1979.  Meghann is Harris's second daughter and also Ahern's second daughter.

During this period, Harris recorded and released three studio albums that reflected a shift toward traditional country (at a time when the public was beginning to embrace a more polished Urban Cowboy sound).  The roots direction was prominent in her Grammy Award–winning 1979 album Blue Kentucky Girl.  Apart from a cover of the Drifters' "Save the Last Dance for Me", the album was largely made up of classic-styled country material in the vein of Loretta Lynn and Kitty Wells.  One of her best-loved albums, it includes songs from the Louvin Brothers' "Everytime You Leave", Willie Nelson's "Sister's Coming Home" and Gram Parsons's signature "Hickory Wind". Wesley Rose took special interest in Harris's recording of "Beneath Still Waters", which became a No. 1 hit.

The Christmas album Light of the Stable was released in 1979; its title track featured backing vocals by Dolly Parton, Linda Ronstadt and Neil Young, all of whom Harris had worked with sporadically since the mid-1970s, and with whom she continued to collaborate through the 2000s. In the 1980s, Harris explored country music's history further with the bluegrass-oriented recording of Roses in the Snow, featuring Ricky Skaggs, Tony Rice, Albert Lee, Emory Gordy Jr. and Jerry Douglas. Harris's versions of the traditional "Wayfaring Stranger" and Paul Simon's "The Boxer" were strong singles.

In 1980, Harris recorded "That Lovin' You Feelin' Again" with Roy Orbison. The duet's recording was a Top-10 hit on both the Country and Adult Contemporary charts. They were awarded a Grammy for Best Country Vocal Performance by a Duo or Group. She was featured on Paul Kennerley's concept album The Legend of Jesse James, which also featured Levon Helm of the Band, Albert Lee, Charlie Daniels and Johnny Cash.

Pop-chart success, songwriting
In 1981, Harris's recordings reached the Top 40 on the Billboard pop chart with a cover of "Mister Sandman"—again Top 10 Country as well as Adult Contemporary—from her Evangeline album. (The album version of the song was a track from the  Trio sessions with Dolly Parton and Linda Ronstadt, but neither Parton's nor Ronstadt's record companies would allow their artists' vocals to be used on the single, so Harris re-recorded the song, singing all three parts for the single release of the song.) She also released her follow-up album, Cimarron, within the same year.

Harris moved to Nashville in 1982. White Shoes in 1983 included an eclectic pairing of the rockish reading of "Diamonds Are a Girl's Best Friend" with a remake of the Donna Summer hit "On the Radio", as well as tracks from a diverse group of songwriters including Hot Band member Crowell, Sandy Denny and T-Bone Burnett. It was her last album produced by Brian Ahern until All I Intended to Be in 2008.

Harris's major-label releases thus far included few of her own songs, but in 1985 her songwriting skills were prominent with the release of a concept album The Ballad of Sally Rose, for which she co-wrote all of the songs. The album was semi-autobiographical, based loosely on her relationship with Parsons. Harris described it as a "country opera", and a "huge commercial disaster".
Her co-writer and producer on the album, English songwriter and musician Paul Kennerley, the writer of the hit singles "Born to Run" (on Harris's 1981 Cimarron album) and "In My Dreams" (on White Shoes). Kennerley also produced her next album, Thirteen. They married in 1985 and divorced in 1993.

Emmylou first appeared on A Prairie Home Companion in 1985 and has been a fan favourite ever since.

In 1987, nearly a full decade after their first attempt, Harris teamed up with Dolly Parton and Linda Ronstadt for a long-promised and long-anticipated Trio disc. The album was the biggest commercial success of Harris's career, spending five weeks at No. 1 on Billboards Country Albums chart (also quickly reaching the Top 10 on the Pop Albums chart). It sold several million copies and produced four Top 10 Country hits, including "To Know Him Is To Love Him", which hit No. 1. The recording was nominated for the coveted Album of the Year Grammy award (given to U2 that year for The Joshua Tree) and the three women won the statuette for Best Country Vocal Performance by a Duo or Group with Vocal; the album's Linda Thompson-penned track "Telling Me Lies" reached No. 3 Country, No. 25 Adult Contemporary, and was nominated for a Grammy as 1987's Best Country Song.

Harris also released a solo album in 1987, Angel Band, featuring traditional gospel songs, on which she worked with then rising country star Vince Gill, and others.  In 1989, she recorded two songs with the Nitty Gritty Dirt Band on their album, Will the Circle Be Unbroken: Volume II. In a snippet of studio chatter included on one of the tracks, she talked during the recording session about her beginnings and how music had changed:

1989's Bluebird album, which featured contributions from Marty Stuart, Bonnie Raitt, and Kate & Anna McGarrigle, included the singles "Heartbreak Hill", which reached No. 8 on the U.S. country singles chart, and "Heaven Only Knows", which reached No. 16, the most recent top-twenty chart singles of Harris's career.  The following year's Brand New Dance album received favorable reviews, but marked the beginning of a chart and airplay decline for Harris.

Around 1991, she dissolved The Hot Band and formed a new band of acoustic musicians—Sam Bush on fiddle, mandolin and vocals, Roy Huskey, Jr. on bass and vocals, Larry Atamanuik on drums, Al Perkins on banjo, guitar, Dobro guitar and vocals, and Jon Randall on guitar, mandolin and vocals—which she named The Nash Ramblers. They recorded a Grammy Award-winning live album in 1992 at the Ryman Auditorium in Nashville, Tennessee, which led to the $8 million restoration of the facility into a premium concert and event venue. It was her last album with Reprise Records.  She has been a member of the Grand Ole Opry since 1992.

New directions

By the 1990s, Harris started receiving less airplay as mainstream country stations began shifting their focus to the youth-oriented "new country" format. As with Brand New Dance, 1993's Cowgirl's Prayer—Harris's first studio album after her switch to Elektra Records—was critically praised but received little airplay, and its lead single, "High Powered Love" charted low, peaking at No. 63, prompting her to shift her career in a new direction.

In 1995, Emmylou Harris was a regular contributor to the original series of the BBC's Transatlantic Sessions; contributing to each of its seven episodes of collaborative live performances by various leading folk and country musicians, who would play music, mostly from Scotland, Ireland, England and North America.

In 1995, Harris released one of the most critically acclaimed albums of the decade, Wrecking Ball, produced by Daniel Lanois, best known for his work with U2, Peter Gabriel and Bob Dylan. An experimental album for Harris, the record included Harris's rendition of the Neil Young–penned title track (Young himself provided guest vocals on two of the album's songs), Steve Earle's "Goodbye", Julie Miller's "All My Tears", Jimi Hendrix's "May This Be Love", Anna McGarrigle's "Goin' Back to Harlan" and Gillian Welch's "Orphan Girl". U2's Larry Mullen, Jr., played drums for the project. The album received virtually no country airplay, but it brought Harris to the attention of alternative rock listeners, many of whom had never listened to her music before.

Harris then took her Wrecking Ball material on the road, releasing the live Spyboy in 1998, backed with a power trio consisting of Nashville producer, songwriter and guitarist Buddy Miller and two New Orleans musicians, drummer Brady Blade and bassist-vocalist-percussionist Daryl Johnson. In addition to performing songs from Wrecking Ball, the album updated many of Harris's career hits, including "Boulder to Birmingham".

Also in 1998, she appeared prominently on Willie Nelson's moody, instrumentally sparse Teatro album, produced by Wrecking Ball producer Lanois.

During the summer of 1997 and 1998, Harris joined Sarah McLachlan's all-woman musical touring festival, the Lilith Fair, where new artists like Patty Griffin could share new experiences and ideas with seasoned musicians like Harris and Bonnie Raitt.

In January 1999, Harris released Trio 2 with Parton and Ronstadt. Much of the album had actually been recorded in 1994 but remained unreleased for nearly five years because of record label and personnel disputes, conflicting schedules, and career priorities of the three artists. Trio 2 was much more contemporary-sounding than its predecessor and was certified Gold. It included their version of Neil Young's classic "After the Gold Rush", which became a popular music video and won another Grammy—this one for Best Country Collaboration with Vocals. Harris and Ronstadt then released a duet album, Western Wall: The Tucson Sessions, later the same year. The two superstars toured together that fall in support of the disc. Both albums made the Top 10 of Billboards Country Albums chart and also did well on the pop chart.

Also in 1999, Harris paid tribute to her former singing partner Gram Parsons by serving as co-executive producer of Return of the Grievous Angel: A Tribute to Gram Parsons, an album that brought together more than a dozen artists. Harris performed duets with Beck, Sheryl Crow and the Pretenders on this album's tracks.

In 2000, Harris released her solo follow-up to Wrecking Ball, Red Dirt Girl, produced by Lanois protégé Malcolm Burn. For the first time since The Ballad of Sally Rose, the album contained a number of Harris's own compositions. Like Wrecking Ball, the album's sound leaned more toward alternative rock than country. Nevertheless, it reached No. 5 on Billboards Country Albums chart as well as a healthy No. 54 on the pop side. It also won Harris another of her 13 Grammy awards, in the category of Best Contemporary Folk Album.

Harris also accompanied alternative country singer Ryan Adams on his solo debut, Heartbreaker and sang on Tracy Chapman's fifth album, Telling Stories.

Also in 2000, Harris joined an all-star group of traditional country, folk and blues artists for the T-Bone Burnett–produced soundtrack to the Coen Brothers film, O Brother, Where Art Thou? The soundtrack won multiple CMA, ACM and Grammy awards. A documentary/concert film, Down from the Mountain, featured the artists performing music from the film and other songs at the Ryman Auditorium. Harris and many of the same artists took their show on the road for the Down from the Mountain Tour in 2002. In 2003, Harris supplied the finishing touches in harmonizing with The Chicks on a song they were recording in the studio, "Godspeed".

Later work
Harris released Stumble into Grace, her follow-up to Red Dirt Girl, in 2003. Like its predecessor, it contained mostly self-penned material. In 2004, Harris led the Sweet Harmony Traveling Revue with Gillian Welch, David Rawlings, Buddy Miller and Patty Griffin. They performed singly and together and swapped instruments.

On September 9, 2005, Harris participated in "Shelter from the Storm: A Concert for the Gulf Coast", a series of concerts simulcast by most American television stations to raise money for victims of Hurricane Katrina and Hurricane Rita. She performed with Beth Nielsen Chapman and the Dixie Chicks, harmonizing on Patty Griffin's song "Mary". She also lent her voice to the soundtrack of the critically acclaimed 2005 film Brokeback Mountain, on the song "A Love That Will Never Grow Old", which was controversially omitted from Oscar consideration because of the insubstantial amount of time the song played during the film.

In 2005, Harris worked with Conor Oberst on Bright Eyes' release, I'm Wide Awake, It's Morning, performing backup vocals on three tracks. In July, she joined Elvis Costello on several dates of his U.S. tour, performing alongside Costello and his band on several numbers each night. July also saw the release of The Very Best of Emmylou Harris: Heartaches & Highways, a single-disc retrospective of Harris's career, on the Rhino Entertainment label. This same year, Harris appeared as a guest vocalist on Neil Young's widely acclaimed Prairie Wind. She also appeared in the Jonathan Demme documentary concert film Neil Young: Heart of Gold, released in 2006.

All the Roadrunning, an album of collaborations with former Dire Straits frontman Mark Knopfler, was released in April 2006 and supported by a tour of Europe and the United States. The album was a commercial success, reaching No. 8 in the U.K. and No. 17 in the United States. Selections recorded during the All the Roadrunning tour performance at the Gibson Amphitheatre were released as a CD/DVD package titled Real Live Roadrunning in November 2006. In addition to several of the compositions that Harris and Knopfler recorded together in the studio, Real Live Roadrunning features solo hits from both members of the duo, as well as a few classics from Knopfler's days with Dire Straits.

Harris is featured on A Tribute to Joni Mitchell, released on April 24, 2007. Harris covered the song "The Magdalene Laundries" (originally on Mitchell's 1994 album, Turbulent Indigo). She sang "Another Pot o' Tea" with Anne Murray on Murray's album Anne Murray Duets: Friends and Legends, released on November 13, 2007, in Canada and on January 15, 2008, in the U.S.

Harris wrote a song entitled "In Rodanthe" for the 2008 film Nights in Rodanthe.

A solo album, All I Intended to Be, was released on June 10, 2008, to critical acclaim. It reached the Top Five of Billboards Country Albums chart and the Top 20 of the Pop Albums chart. Contributors include Buddy Miller, the McGarrigle sisters, Vince Gill, Phil Madeira, and her Trio sister Dolly Parton. Harris toured with an ensemble she dubbed the Red Dirt Boys, featuring Phil Madeira on accordion, guitar, and keyboards, Colin Linden on guitar and banjo, Rickie Simpkins on mandolin and fiddle, Chris Donohue on bass, and Bryan Owings on drums. It did not include Miller, who was touring with Robert Plant, Alison Krauss and T-Bone Burnett at the time. In 2009, Harris toured with Patty Griffin, Shawn Colvin, and Miller as "Three Girls and Their Buddy". Madeira, Simpkins, and Donohue performed with her in late 2008 and 2009, appearing on "A Prairie Home Companion" and at MerleFest and the Telluride Bluegrass Festival. In September 2009, Owings rejoined the Red Dirt Boys with Miller for the remainder of 2009.

In 2010, Harris regrouped with the latest version of the Red Dirt Boys—Madeira, Owings, Donohue, and Simpkins—for Lilith Fair summer dates and a scheduled U.S. autumn tour.

According to an interview with Bonnie Tyler by Digital Spy, Harris will be teaming up with her on Tyler's upcoming album. Harris will do backing vocals on a song written and produced by Wayne Warner. A solo album, Hard Bargain, was released on the Nonesuch label on April 26, 2011.  It reached No. 3 on Billboards Country Albums chart—her highest-charting album since 1980—and the Top 20 of the Pop Albums chart.

PBS host Tavis Smiley interviewed Harris in a program that aired on April 20, 2011. In the interview Harris spoke of being a straight-A student in high school, which led her to being selected as valedictorian, and recounted learning to play guitar by memorizing three chords.

In 2011 she released a version of the song 'To Ohio' in collaboration with the American indie folk band 'The Low Anthem'. Later in 2011, she collaborated with Australian musician and screenwriter Nick Cave on the soundtrack to John Hillcoat's film Lawless. Set in Depression-era Franklin County, Virginia, U.S., the film was released in August 2012 in the U.S. and September 2012 in the U.K.

Old Yellow Moon, an album of duets featuring Harris and former Hot Band member Rodney Crowell, was released on February 26, 2013. This was another Billboard Top 10 Country album for Harris, and in 2014 she won her 13th Grammy Award for it.

The Traveling Kind, a collaboration with Rodney Crowell, was released May 12, 2015, by Nonesuch Records which earned the pair a second Americana Music Award for Duo/Group of the year and also garnered two Grammy nominations.

In 2016, Harris was honored with a tribute concert entitled The Life & Songs of Emmylou Harris, which was later released as both a DVD and a live CD. The concert featured several of Harris's closest friends and collaborators including Rodney Crowell, Buddy Miller, Patty Griffin, Lucinda Williams, Alison Krauss, Lee Ann Womack, Martina McBride, Vince Gill and Sheryl Crow. Harris performed three songs at the concert: "Gone, Long Gone" (with John Starling), "Blackhawk" (with Daniel Lanois), and "Boulder to Birmingham" with the entire cast.

Harris performed at the 2019 Musicians Hall of Fame and Museum Concert and Induction Ceremony.

Ramble in Music City: The Lost Concert was released by Nonesuch Records in 2021.

Personal life
Harris has been married three times. Her marriage to Tom Slocum lasted from 1969 to 1970 and produced one child, Mika Hallie Slocum, born on March 15, 1970. From 1977 to 1984 she was married to Brian Ahern, with whom she had one child, Meghann Ahern, born on September 9, 1979. From 1985 to 1993, she was married to Paul Kennerley.

She has a granddaughter who was born in 2009, and a grandson who was born in 2012. Harris is a vegetarian.

Activism
In 1997 and 1998, Harris performed in Sarah McLachlan's Lilith Fair, promoting feminism in music. Since 1999, Harris has organized an annual benefit tour called Concerts for a Landmine-Free World. All proceeds from the tours support the Vietnam Veterans of America Foundation's (VVAF) efforts to assist innocent victims of conflicts around the world. The tour also benefits the VVAF's work to raise US awareness of the global land mine problem. Artists that have joined Harris on the road for these dates include Mary Chapin Carpenter, Bruce Cockburn, Sheryl Crow, Steve Earle, Joan Baez, Patty Griffin, Nanci Griffith, Willie Nelson, and Lucinda Williams. Harris is a supporter of animal rights and an active member of People for the Ethical Treatment of Animals (PETA). She founded Bonaparte's Retreat, an animal shelter in Nashville, and assists there in her spare time.

She became a member of the newly formed Commission on the Humanities and Social Sciences of the American Academy of Arts and Sciences in 2011.

Awards and other honors

Grammy Awards
The Grammy Awards celebrate outstanding achievement in music. Harris has won 14 out of 48 nominations.

Country Music Association Awards
The CMA Awards recognize outstanding achievement in the country music industry. Harris has won 3 awards out of 24 nominations.

Academy of Country Music Awards
The ACM Awards recognize achievements in country music. Harris has won 2 awards from 12 nominations.

International Bluegrass Music Association Awards
The International Bluegrass Music Association recognise outstanding achievement in Bluegrass music. Harris has received five awards for her contributions to a Louvin Brothers tribute album, a Nitty Gritty Dirt Band album and a film (and the resulting documentary) soundtrack.

Americana Music Association Awards
The Americana Music Honors & Awards recognize outstanding achievement in Americana music. Of 5 nominations, Harris has won 4.

Satellite Awards
The Satellite Awards, presented by the International Press Academy, honor the best in film and television. Harris has won one award.

Other honors
 Became a member of the Grand Ole Opry, 1992
 VH1's 100 Most Influential Women in Rock and Roll, 1998 – Number 22 out of 100
 Billboards Century Award recipient, 1999 – inducted by Sarah McLachlan
 CMT's 40 Greatest Women of Country Music, 2002 – Number 5 out of 40
Golden Plate Award of the American Academy of Achievement, 2004
 Inducted into the Country Music Hall of Fame, February 12, 2008
  Inducted into the American Academy of Arts and Sciences, 2009
 Honorary doctorate of music from Berklee College of Music, 2009
 Swedish Polar Music Prize, 2015
 Hollywood Walk of Fame, 2019 (with Dolly Parton and Linda Ronstadt)

Discography

Collaborations and other appearances

Legacy 
Swedish folk duo First Aid Kit released the song "Emmylou" in 2012 as a tribute to Harris. They performed the song for Harris when she received the Polar Music Prize in 2015.

References

 In the Country of Country: A Journey to the Roots of American Music, Nicholas Dawidoff, Vintage Books, 1998. 
 Emmylou Harris: Angel in Disguise, Jim Brown, Fox Music Books, 2004.  
 Fong-Torres, Ben. (1998). "Emmylou Harris". In The Encyclopedia of Country Music. Paul Kingsbury, Editor. New York: Oxford University Press. p. 230.

External links

  (requires Flash player)
 Emmylou Harris Comprehensive former official site

Country Music Hall of Fame and Museum
 Emmylou Harris Questionnaire (June 2008)
 Pitchfork article
 Gibson interview
 Interview

Emmylou Harris Interview for the NAMM Oral History Library (2016)

1947 births
20th-century American guitarists
20th-century American women guitarists
20th-century American women singers
21st-century American guitarists
21st-century American women guitarists
21st-century American women singers
American acoustic guitarists
American country guitarists
American country singer-songwriters
American women country singers
American folk guitarists
American rock singers
American sopranos
Americana Music Honors & Awards winners
Asylum Records artists
Country Music Hall of Fame inductees
Country musicians from Alabama
Country musicians from North Carolina
Elektra Records artists
Grand Ole Opry members
Grammy Lifetime Achievement Award winners
Guitarists from Alabama
Guitarists from North Carolina
Guitarists from Virginia
Jubilee Records artists
Living people
Members of the Country Music Association
Musicians from Birmingham, Alabama
Nonesuch Records artists
People from Woodbridge, Virginia
Reprise Records artists
Rhino Records artists
Singer-songwriters from North Carolina
Singer-songwriters from Virginia
Singer-songwriters from Alabama
Stony Plain Records artists
University of North Carolina at Greensboro people
Warner Records artists
20th-century American singers
21st-century American singers
Lyle Lovett and His Large Band members